Billy Granville is a retired professional American football player who played linebacker for the Cincinnati Bengals.

References

1974 births
American football linebackers
Cincinnati Bengals players
Duke Blue Devils football players
Living people
Lawrenceville School alumni